"Get Me Some" is the debut single by Australian group, Mercury4 released in 2003 from their self-titled debut album Mercury4. "Get Me Some" debuted and peaked at #5 on the Australian ARIA Singles Chart, but descended from then on and lasted a relatively short eight weeks on the chart. "Get Me Some" remains Mercury4's most successful single and only top ten single to date.

Charts

References

2003 singles
2003 songs